Homework is a 1982 comedy film directed by James Beshears and starring Joan Collins. The film was marketed with the tagline "Every young man needs a teacher."

Summary
Homework tells the story of Tommy (Michael Morgan), a young rock star who is also a virgin. As he tries to lose his virginity to local high school girls, a classmate's mother (Joan Collins) decides to make a man of him.

Cast
Joan Collins as Diana
Michael Morgan as Tommy
Shell Kepler as Lisa
Lanny Horn as Ralph
Erin Donovan as Sheila
Lee Purcell as Ms. Jackson
Renée Harris as Cookie
Mark Brown as Mix
Steve Gustafson as John
Carrie Snodgress as Dr. Delingua
Wings Hauser as Reddog
Betty Thomas as Reddog's secretary

Lawsuits
The day before the film's premiere, it was reported that Joan Collins, Betty Thomas, Carrie Snodgress and Lee Purcell had all taken legal action to get their names removed from the credits. Collins claimed that the film's advertising was misleading because she had only performed in a minor supporting role shot two years earlier, but a sex scene had been added afterward using a body double to cash in on her new celebrity status from the hit TV show Dynasty. The other three performers claimed they had been under a false impression about the kind of film they were making. Collins' attorneys won a partial victory when a federal court ordered Jensen Farley Pictures to stop using ads that depicted Collins nude.

Reception
Variety called the film "a very poorly-made sex comedy" with "plentiful post-production doctoring" in evidence. Gene Siskel of the Chicago Tribune gave the film zero stars out of four, declaring: "A miserable excuse for a movie. One of the year's worst." Dale Pollock wrote in the Los Angeles Times that the film was marred by "poor photography, sloppy editing and atrocious acting," and that the body double in the sex scene "doesn't even resemble Collins."

References

External links
 
 

1982 films
1982 comedy films
Films about virginity
1980s English-language films
American comedy films
1980s American films